Pterostylis ophioglossa, commonly known as the snake-tongue greenhood, is a species of orchid endemic to eastern Australia. It has a rosette of leaves at the base and a single dull green, white and brown flower with a deeply notched labellum.

Description
Pterostylis ophioglossa is a terrestrial,  perennial, deciduous, herb with an underground tuber and a rosette of between four and six egg-shaped leaves. Flowering occurs between April and July.

Taxonomy and naming
Pterostylis ophioglossa was first described in 1810 by Robert Brown and the description was published in Prodromus Florae Novae Hollandiae et Insulae Van Diemen. The specific epithet (ophioglossa) is derived from the ancient Greek words  meaning "snake" and  meaning "tongue".

Distribution and habitat
The snake-tongue greenhood grows in sheltered places in forest and scrub in coastal areas between Sydney in New South Wales and Eungella in Queensland.

References

ophioglossa
Endemic orchids of Australia
Orchids of New South Wales
Orchids of Queensland
Plants described in 1810